Aequorivita antarctica  is a bacterium from the genus of Aequorivita which occurs in coastal antarctic sea-ice and antarctic seawater.

References

External links
Type strain of Aequorivita antarctica at BacDive -  the Bacterial Diversity Metadatabase

Further reading
 

Flavobacteria
Bacteria described in 2002